Alberto Acosta (born 1966) is a retired Argentinian footballer.

Alberto Acosta may also refer to:

 Alberto Acosta (diver) (born 1973), Mexican diver
 Beto Acosta (born 1977), Uruguayan footballer
 Alberto Acosta (Mexican footballer) (born 1988), Mexican footballer